Cabomba is an aquatic plant genus, one of two belonging to the family Cabombaceae. It has divided submerged leaves in the shape of a fan (hence the vernacular name fanwort) and is much favoured by aquarists as an ornamental and oxygenating plant for fish tanks. Use in the aquarium trade has led to some species being introduced to other parts of the world, such as Australia, where they have become weeds.

Species
Cabomba aquatica Aubl. (fanwort)
Cabomba caroliniana A. Gray (green cabomba)
Cabomba furcata Schult. & Schult.f. (red cabomba)
Cabomba haynesii 
Cabomba palaeformis Fassett

Cabomba as an aquarium plant
Cabomba is frequently planted in aquaria, as an attractive-leaved water plant that is fast-growing (up to one inch per day). Green cabomba (C. caroliniana) is the most common, and the easiest aquarium subject. By contrast, red cabomba (C. furcata) is considered to be one of the hardest plants to care for in the aquarium.

Flowers and reproduction

The perianth of Cabomba is either trimerous (having members in each whorl in groups of three) or dimerous (in groups of two) with white, oval-shaped petals, and is usually about 2.0 cm across when fully developed.  The petals are unlike the sepals in that the former have two yellow ear-shaped nectaries at the base.  Petals may also have purplish edges.  Flowers are protogynous, having primarily female sexual structures on the first day of appearance and then switching to male on the second and subsequent days.  Flowers emerge and are designed to be pollinated above the waterline.  Principal pollinators are flies and other small flying insects.

References

 Ørgaard, M. (1991). The genus Cabomba (Cabombaceae) - a taxonomic study. Nordic Journal of Botany 11: 179-203
Day, C., Petroechevsky, A., Pellow, B., Bevan, J., O’Dwyer, T., StLawrence, A. and Smith, G. (2014). Managing a priority outlier infestation of Cabomba caroliniana in a natural wetland in the Blue Mountains, NSW, Australia – could this be eradication? Draft Paper to 19th Australasian Weeds Conference, Hobart, Australia.
 Fassett, N.C. 1953. A monograph of Cabomba. Castanea

External links 

InvadingSpecies.com
United States Department of Agriculture, Germplasm Resources Information Network (GRIN): Cabomba 
Information about Cabomba for Aquarium Hobbyists

Nymphaeales genera
Freshwater plants
Nymphaeales
Taxa named by Jean Baptiste Christian Fusée-Aublet